HD 139664 is a single star in the southern constellation of Lupus. It has the Bayer designation g Lupi; HD 139664 is the star's identifier from the Henry Draper Catalogue. It has a yellow-white hue and is visible to the naked eye with an apparent visual magnitude of 4.64. The star is located at a distance of 57 light years from the Sun based on parallax, and it is drifting closer with a radial velocity of −7 km/s. It is a member of the Hercules-Lyra Association of co-moving stars.

This is an F-type main-sequence star with a stellar classification of F3/5V, which indicates it is generating energy through core hydrogen fusion. The estimated age is poorly constrained at around one billion years, but the age of the Hercules-Lyra Association to which it belongs is  million years. It has a moderately high rate of spin, showing a projected rotational velocity of 71.6 km/s. The star has 1.37 times the mass of the Sun and 1.26 times the Sun's radius. It is radiating 3.31 times the luminosity of the Sun from its photosphere at an effective temperature of 6,704 K.

A debris disk has been imaged around this star using the coronagraphic mode of the ACS instrument on the Hubble Space Telescope. The disk appears to have a dust maximum at 83 AU from the star and a sharp outer boundary at 109 AU. These features may be caused by gravitational perturbations from planets orbiting the star.

References

F-type main-sequence stars
Circumstellar disks
Lupus (constellation)
Lupi, g
Durchmusterung objects
0594
139664
076829
5825